Apostolos Stikas (born 20 September 1996) is a Greek professional footballer who plays as a centre-back for Super League 2 club Veria.

References

1996 births
Living people
Greek footballers
Greek expatriate footballers
Football League (Greece) players
Serie C players
Serie D players
Panegialios F.C. players
S.S. Racing Club Fondi players
Cesena F.C. players
Kavala F.C. players
Association football defenders
A.S.D. Mezzolara players
Footballers from Patras